Sidney G. "Sid" Veysey (born July 30, 1955) is a Canadian retired professional ice hockey centre who played one game in the National Hockey League, with the Vancouver Canucks on October 14, 1977. The rest of his professional career was spent in the minor leagues, mainly in the Central Hockey League. Selected by the Canucks in the 1975 NHL Amateur Draft, Veysey made his professional debut that year, and played hockey until retiring in 1983. He later became a scout for the Saint John Sea Dogs of the major junior Quebec Major Junior Hockey League

Playing career
Veysey was selected 182nd overall in the 1975 NHL Amateur Draft by the Vancouver Canucks. Despite being an 11th round pick, he would have a strong start to his pro career, being named the IHL Rookie of the Year in 1976, scoring 87 points for the Fort Wayne Komets. The following season, he led the Tulsa Oilers, Vancouver's top minor-pro affiliate in scoring with 80 points. He made his NHL debut on October 14, 1977, but after playing just the one game was returned to Tulsa.

After returning to the minors and suffering through a disappointing season in Tulsa which was ruined by shoulder problems, Veysey retired from professional hockey to return to school at the University of New Brunswick, although he continued to play amateur hockey for the school. Following the completion of his degree, he made a brief comeback to pro hockey, suiting up for 17 games in the AHL in 1981–82 before retiring.

Post-playing career
Veysey is now a regional scout for the Saint John Sea Dogs of the Quebec Major Junior Hockey League.

Career statistics

Regular season and playoffs

See also
List of players who played only one game in the NHL

References

External links

Profile at hockeydraftcentral.com

1955 births
Living people
Canadian expatriate ice hockey players in the United States
Canadian ice hockey centres
Edmonton Oilers (WHA) draft picks
Fort Wayne Komets players
Fredericton Express players
Ice hockey people from New Brunswick
New Brunswick Varsity Reds ice hockey players
People from Woodstock, New Brunswick
Sherbrooke Castors players
Tulsa Oilers (1964–1984) players
University of New Brunswick alumni
Vancouver Canucks draft picks
Vancouver Canucks players